Pegunigalsidase alfa is an experimental medication under investigation as an enzyme replacement therapy for the treatment of Fabry disease. It is a recombinant human α-galactosidase-A.

The most common side effects are infusion-related reactions, hypersensitivity and asthenia.

Society and culture

Legal status 
On 23 February 2023, the Committee for Medicinal Products for Human Use (CHMP) of the European Medicines Agency (EMA) adopted a positive opinion, recommending the granting of a marketing authorization for the medicinal product Elfabrio, intended for the treatment of Fabry disease. The applicant for this medicinal product is Chiesi Farmaceutici S.p.A.

References

Further reading 
 

Drugs acting on the gastrointestinal system and metabolism
Experimental medical treatments
Orphan drugs
Recombinant proteins